The following is a list of squads for each national team competing at the 2022 UEFA Women's Under-17 Championship in Bosnia and Herzegovina. Each national team had to submit a squad of 20 players born on or after 1 January 2005.

Group A

Bosnia and Herzegovina

Denmark
The Danish squad was announced on 28 April 2022.

Head coach: Claus Struck

Germany
The German squad was announced on 23 April 2022.

Head coach: Friederike Kromp

Netherlands
The Dutch squad was announced on 18 April 2022.

Head coach: Thomas Oostendorp

Group B

Finland
Finland named their squad on 22 April 2022.

Head coach: Marko Saloranta

France
France named their squad on 19 April 2022.

Head coach: Cécile Locatelli

Norway

Head coach:

Spain
Spain named their squad on 20 April 2022.

Head coach: Kenio Gonzalo

References

External links
Squads on UEFA.com

2022 UEFA Women's Under-17 Championship
Association football women's tournament squads